Kolbe Catholic College may refer to:

 Kolbe Catholic College, Rockingham
 Kolbe Catholic College, Greenvale